The Order of the British Empire is a British order of chivalry. Established on 4 June 1917 to recognise civilian contributions to the British war effort during the First World War, it was expanded to include a military division at the end of 1918. While continuing to recognise achievement and service in the military, it has since become the main state honour for recognising achievements in public life in the United Kingdom. The order has had five grades since its inception. The top two, Knight or Dame Grand Cross (the most senior) and Knight or Dame Commander, confer the style of knighthood (for men) or damehood (for women) upon the recipient. The following is a list of Knights and Dames Commander appointed from the beginning of 1919 to the end of 1920; at least 311 people were given the honour in this period, many for services relating to the war effort.

List of Knights and Dames Commander of the Order of the British Empire

References 

Order of the British Empire